Uzbek may refer to:

 Someone or something related to Uzbekistan
 Uzbeks, an ethnic group
 Uzbek language
 Uzbek cuisine
 Uzbek culture
 Ozbeg Khan (1282–1341), khan of the Golden Horde of the Mongol Empire
 Muzaffar al-Din Uzbek or Özbeg ibn Muhammad Pahlawan, last ruler of the Eldiguzids
 Khalil Khan Uzbek (1752–1755), the khan of the Erivan Khanate

See also 
 
 

Language and nationality disambiguation pages